François Blanchet may refer to:
François Norbert Blanchet (1795–1883), first archbishop of Oregon City
François Blanchet (physician) (1776–1830), physician, seigneur and politician in Lower Canada